Willi Wolff (16 April 1883 – 6 April 1947) was a German screenwriter, film producer, and director. He was married to the silent film star Ellen Richter, whose films he often worked on.

Selected filmography

Director
 Lola Montez, the King's Dancer (1922)
 The Great Unknown (1924)
 Flight Around the World (1925)
 Shadows of the Metropolis (1925)
 The Great Duchess (1926)
 Maytime (1926)
 The Imaginary Baron (1927)
 The Most Beautiful Legs of Berlin (1927)
 The Lady with the Tiger Skin (1927)
 Heads Up, Charley (1927)
 Moral (1928)
 Immorality (1928)
 The Woman Without Nerves (1930)
 Police Spy 77 (1930)
 The Adventurer of Tunis (1931)
 Madame Pompadour (1931)
 A Caprice of Pompadour (1931)
 The Secret of Johann Orth (1932)
 Manolescu, Prince of Thieves (1933)

Screenwriter
 The Monastery of Sendomir (1919)
 The Teahouse of the Ten Lotus Flowers (1919)
 Out of the Depths (1919)
 Napoleon and the Little Washerwoman (1920)
 The Love of a Thief (1920)
 Mary Tudor (1920)
 Princess Woronzoff (1920)
 The Riddle of the Sphinx (1921)
 The Adventuress of Monte Carlo (1921)
 The White Death (1921)

Bibliography
 Bach, Steven. Marlene Dietrich: Life and Legend. University of Minnesota Press, 2011. 
 Ragowski, Christian. The Many Faces of Weimar Cinema: Rediscovering Germany's Filmic Legacy. Camden House, 2010.

External links

1883 births
1947 deaths
Film people from Saxony-Anhalt
People from Schönebeck
Jewish emigrants from Nazi Germany to France